Cuba competed in the 2019 Pan American Games in Lima, Peru from July 26 to August 11, 2019.

On July 6, 2019, wrestler Mijaín López was named as the country's flag bearer during the opening ceremony.

The Cuban team consisted of 420 athletes.

Medalists

The following Cuban competitors won medals at the games.

|  style="text-align:left; width:78%; vertical-align:top;"|

|  style="text-align:left; width:26%; vertical-align:top;"|

Competitors
The following is the list of number of competitors (per gender) participating at the games per sport/discipline.

Archery

Men

Women

Mixed

Badminton

Cuba qualified a team of six badminton athletes (three per gender).

Men
3 quotas

Women
3 quotas

Baseball

Cuba qualified a men's team of 24 athletes by finishing in the top four at the 2019 Pan American Games Qualifier in Brazil.

Group B

Basque pelota

Men

Women

Beach volleyball

Cuba qualified four beach volleyball athletes (two men and two women).

Men
1 Pair (2 athletes)

Women
1 Pair (2 athletes)

Boxing

Cuba qualified ten male boxers.

Men

Canoeing

Sprint
Cuba qualified a total of 12 sprint athletes (six men and six women).
Men

Women

Qualification legend: QF – Qualify to final; SF – Qualify to semifinal

Diving

Men

Women

Fencing

Cuba qualified a team of 14 fencers (seven men and seven women).

Men
Épée – 3 quotas
Foil – 1 quota
Sabre – 3 quotas

Women
Épée – 3 quotas
Foil – 3 quotas
Sabre – 1 quota

Field hockey

Cuba qualified a men's and women's team (of 16 athletes each, for a total of 32) by being ranked among the top two nations at the field hockey at the 2018 Central American and Caribbean Games tournaments.

Men's tournament

Preliminary round

Quarter-finals

Cross over

5th place match

Women's tournament

Preliminary round

Quarter-finals

Cross over

7th place match

Modern pentathlon

Cuba qualified five modern pentathletes (two men and three women).

Men
2 quotas

Women
3 quotas

Racquetball

Cuba qualified four racquetball athletes (two men and two women).

Men
2 quotas

Women
2 quotas

Rowing

Men

Women

Sailing

Men

Women

Mixed

Open

Shooting

Men

Women

Mixed

Softball

Cuba qualified a men's team (of 15 athletes) by being ranked in the top five nations at the 2017 Pan American Championships.

Men's tournament

Preliminary round

Semifinals

Table tennis

Men

Women

Mixed

Taekwondo

Kyorugi (sparring)
Men

Women

Tennis

Men

Weightlifting

Cuba qualified eight weightlifters (four men and four women).

Men

Women

Wrestling

Men

Women

See also
Cuba at the 2020 Summer Olympics

References

Nations at the 2019 Pan American Games
Pan American Games
2019